Dumaine and DuMaine are surnames. Notable people with either surname include:

Bernard Dumaine (born 1953), French artist
Cyrille Dumaine (1897–1946), Canadian politician
Frederic C. Dumaine Jr. (1902–1997), American business executive
Pierre DuMaine (1931–2019), American Roman Catholic bishop

Fictional characters:
Dumaine, a character in Shakespeare's Love's Labour's Lost

Other uses
Dumaine Street in the French Quarter of the city of New Orleans, USA.